Acalolepta strandiella is a species of beetle in the family Cerambycidae. It was described by Stephan von Breuning in 1935.

Subspecies
 Acalolepta strandiella strandiella (Breuning, 1935)
 Acalolepta strandiella websteri Breuning, 1970

References

Acalolepta
Beetles described in 1935